Martin Jensen may refer to:

Music
Martin Jensen (DJ), Danish DJ and music producer
Martin Jensen (sound engineer), American sound engineer

Sports
Martin S. Jensen (born 1973), Danish footballer
Martin Jensen (footballer) (born 1978), Danish footballer
Martin Jensen (cricketer) (born 1976), Danish cricketer
Martin Jensen (triple jumper) (1942–2016), Norwegian triple jumper